Apache AxKit was an XML Apache publishing framework run by the Apache foundation written in Perl. It provided conversion from XML to any format, such as HTML, WAP or text using either W3C standard techniques, or flexible custom code.

AxKit was a standard tool in early digital humanities presentation work, being used to convert formats such as Text Encoding Initiative XML to HTML. It is still used by some institutions, but software such as eXist and Apache Cocoon is normally used in modern projects.

Apache Axkit was retired in August 2009.

References

Further reading
 "XML Publishing with AxKit: Managing web content with Perl and XML" Kip Hampton "O'Reilly Media, Inc.", 2004, 
 "Practical mod_perl" Stas Bekman, Eric Cholet "O'Reilly Media, Inc.", 2003 
 https://www.emeraldinsight.com/doi/full/10.1108/07378830510636328

External links

Free software programmed in Perl
XML software
Perl software